The molecular formula C77H109N21O19S (molar mass: 1664.884 g/mol) may refer to:

 Alpha-Melanocyte-stimulating hormone (α-MSH)
 Melanocyte-stimulating hormone (MSH)

Molecular formulas